State Route 82 (SR 82) is a state route in northeastern Ohio, with a western terminus at State Route 57 in Lorain County, southeast of Elyria.

Route description

The route travels predominantly eastward through the southern suburbs of Cleveland as it traverses part of Lorain County, the southern tier of Cuyahoga County, the northern tier of Summit County, and enters Portage County.  This segment of State Route 82 is very heavily traveled, and intersects with four interstate highways.  Six-ramp interchanges join the route with Interstate 71 and Interstate 77, a partial interchange joins 82 with Interstate 271, and a diamond interchange intersects with Interstate 480/State Route 14.  The route also passes through the Cuyahoga Valley National Park in Brecksville, where it crosses the Cuyahoga River on the Brecksville-Northfield High Level Bridge.  

After passing through the northern tier of Portage County, State Route 82 crosses central Trumbull County, becoming a freeway for ten miles (16 km) along with  State Route 5  as it bypasses the city of Warren.  East of Warren, the route continues as a 4-lane divided highway, with level intersections at most secondary roads and interchanges with most other state highways, including a modified cloverleaf interchange with State Route 11.  Just before the Pennsylvania state line, State Route 82 meets its eastern terminus with a full cloverleaf interchange in Masury at U.S. Route 62 and Trumbull CR 331 (Hubbard-Masury Road), which continues south.

History
The former alignment of State Route 82 in Trumbull followed Market Street through Warren (concurrent with State Route 5 to Elm Road), and then continued east on what is now Warren-Sharon Road through Howland, Vienna, and Brookfield Center.  The former eastern terminus of the route was where Warren-Sharon Road meets the Pennsylvania state line, and State Street in Sharon, Pennsylvania continues east. 

In 2012, three men were sentenced to prison for a plot to blow up the Route 82 bridge in Cuyahoga Valley National Park.

Major intersections

References

082
Transportation in Lorain County, Ohio
Transportation in Portage County, Ohio
Transportation in Trumbull County, Ohio
Transportation in Summit County, Ohio
Transportation in Cuyahoga County, Ohio
Strongsville, Ohio